mm2 Entertainment (a wholly owned subsidiary of mm2 Asia Ltd) is a Singaporean film production and distribution company. It has produced notable films include Ah Boys to Men, The Lion Men and Long Long Time Ago series. Also, it has a presence in Hong Kong (mm2 Hong Kong), Taipei and China. The company also owned cinemas in Malaysia and Singapore.

History
mm2 was founded in Malaysia in 2008. In 2014, mm2 Asia became the first Singaporean film production company to be listed in the Singapore Exchange.

In November 2017, mm2 Asia bought Cathay Organisation's eight cinemas for S$230 million.

In August 2021, investment firm Kingsmead Properties entered into an agreement with mm2 Asia to purchase its Cathay cinema business for S$84.8 million which was to be completed by 31 December 2021. In January 2022, the deal was cancelled, Kingsmead Properties' deposit for the purchase was converted into newly issued mm2 shares.

Productions

Film

2010 Old Cow vs Tender Grass
2010 Phua Chu Kang The Movie
2010 Love Cuts
2011 The Ghosts Must Be Crazy
2011 Perfect Rivals
2011 Twisted
2011 23:59
2011 Already Famous
2012 We Not Naughty
2012 Greedy Ghost
2012 Imperfect
2012 My Dog Dou Dou
2012 Ah Boys to Men
2013 Ah Boys to Men 2
2013 Ghost Child
2013 Judgment Day 
2013 That Girl in Pinafore 
2013 Everybody's Business
2014 The Lion Men
2014 Kisau 
2014 The Lion Men: Ultimate Showdown
2014 The Transcend
2014 Seventh
2014 Wayang Boy
2014 The Ultimate Winner 
2014 Behind The Scene
2015 Bring Back The Dead
2015 Ah Boys to Men 3: Frogmen
2015 1965
2015 3688
2015 Mr. Unbelievable
2016 Long Long Time Ago
2016 Long Long Time Ago 2
2016 My Love Sinema
2016 4 Love
2017 The Fortune Handbook
2017 Take 2
2017 Goodbye Mr Loser
2017 Lucky Boy
2017 Wonder Boy
2017 Ah Boys to Men 4
2018 Wonderful! Liang Xi Mei
2018 The Big Day
2018 23:59: The Haunted Hour 
2018 Zombiepura 
2019 Make It Big Big
2019 A Journey of Happiness
2020 The Diam Diam Era
2020 Precious Is the Night
2020 Number 1
2021 The Diam Diam Era Too
2022 Ah Girls Go Army

References

External links
 

Companies listed on the Singapore Exchange
Film production companies of Singapore
Entertainment companies established in 2008
Mass media companies established in 2008
Malaysian companies established in 2008
Singaporean companies established in 2008
2008 establishments in Malaysia